Saint Lucia first competed at the Commonwealth Games in 1962. They appeared again in 1970 and 1978, and have appeared in every Games since 1994. The first out of their three medals came in 2002 in the men's pole vault, a bronze from Dominic Johnson. Their second and third medals came in 2010 and 2014 in the women's high jump, 2 bronzes from Levern Spencer.

Medals

References

 
Nations at the Commonwealth Games